Freddy Eugen (4 February 1941 – 8 June 2018) was a Danish cyclist who was active between 1961 and 1969 on the road and track. On track he won two European medals in the madison event in 1967 and 1968. On the road he won 9 six-day races out of 95 starts, including the Six Days of Amsterdam (1967), as well as one stage of the Tour de Suisse (1963).

References

1941 births
2018 deaths
Danish male cyclists
Cyclists from Copenhagen
Tour de Suisse stage winners